Granville Charles Gomer Gordon, 13th Marquess of Huntly (born 4 February 1944), styled Earl of Aboyne until 1987, is a Scottish peer and the Premier Marquess of Scotland.

He was a hereditary member of the House of Lords from 1987 to 1999.

Early life
Huntly is the son of Douglas Gordon, 12th Marquess of Huntly, by the Honourable Mary Pamela Berry, daughter of Gomer Berry, 1st Viscount Kemsley. His older sister, Lady Pamela Lemina Gordon, married the Hon. Ian Henry Lawson-Johnston (second son of Ian Lawson-Johnston, 2nd Baron Luke) in 1970. He was educated at Gordonstoun.

Career
He succeeded to the marquessate of Huntly in 1987 on the death of his father (who had inherited the marquessate from his great-uncle, Charles Gordon, 11th Marquess of Huntly) and contributed occasionally in the House of Lords. However, he lost his seat in parliament after the passing of the House of Lords Act 1999. He is also the Chief of Clan Gordon.

Personal life
He married Jane Elizabeth Angela, daughter of Alistair Monteith Gibb, in 1972. They had one son and two daughters before getting divorced in 1990:

 Alastair Gordon, Earl of Aboyne (b. 1973), who married Sophia Cunningham, daughter of Michael Cunningham, in 2004.
 Lady Amy Jane Gordon (b. 1975)
 Lady Lucy Yoskyl Gordon (b. Jul 1979)

Lord Huntly married secondly in 1991 to Catheryn Milbourn (née Kindersley). The former wife of Robert Lennon Milbourn, she was the eldest daughter of Gay Kindersley (a grandson of Robert Kindersley, 1st Baron Kindersley) and the former Margaret Diana Wakefield (a daughter of Hugh Wakefield of Mayfair, London). The Marchioness is a Patroness of the Royal Caledonian Ball. Together, they were the parents of one daughter:

 Lady Rose Marie-Louise Gordon (b. 1993)

The seat of Lord and Lady Huntly is Aboyne Castle in Aberdeenshire.

Titles 
Since 1987, he is: 
 13th Marquess of Huntly (Peerage of Scotland, 1599)
 18th Earl of Huntly (Peerage of Scotland, 1445), contested
 13th Earl of Enzie (Peerage of Scotland, 1599), contested
 13th Lord Gordon of Badenoch (Peerage of Scotland, 1599), contested
 9th Earl of Aboyne (Peerage of Scotland, 1660)
 9th Lord Gordon of Strathavon and Glenlivet (Peerage of Scotland, 1660)
 5th Baron Meldrum, of Morven in the county of Aberdeen (Peerage of United Kingdom, 1815)

References

External links

1944 births
Scottish clan chiefs
Scottish people of Welsh descent
Living people
People educated at Gordonstoun
13
Earls of Aboyne
People educated at Sunningdale School
Huntly